Stephensburg is an unincorporated community in Hardin County, Kentucky, United States.

Notable people
Richard P. Giles, Missouri politician, was born in Stephensburg.

Notes

Unincorporated communities in Hardin County, Kentucky
Unincorporated communities in Kentucky